Cornelia W. Conant (born ca. 1840–1850) was an American painter and writer.

She was on the membership committee of the Brooklyn Arts Club in 1894 and showed works at the Brooklyn Art Association and the National Academy of Design. She was also a writer who wrote about a study trip to Belgium in a piece for Harper's Magazine, featuring the school run by the painter Pierre Édouard Frère.

Her painting The End of the Story was included in the 1905 book Women Painters of the World.

Gallery

References

Footnotes

Sources
An Art Student in Ecouen, The Harpers Monthly, February 1885, pp. 388–398

19th-century births
Year of death missing
19th-century American painters
American women painters
19th-century American women artists